The Tenth Island, sometimes called Barrenjoey, part of the Waterhouse Island Group, is a  uninhabited granite islet and nature reserve, situated in Bass Strait, lying close to the north-eastern coast of Tasmania, Australia. The islet has no vegetation and much of it is wave-washed in winter storms. The Aboriginal name for the island is recorded as Roobala mangana.

Other islands in the Waterhouse Group include Ninth, Maclean, Waterhouse, Little Waterhouse, Baynes, St Helens, Foster, Swan, Little Swan, Cygnet and Paddys islands and Bird Rock and George Rocks islets.

Fauna and marine life

The island is home to a significant breeding colony of Australian fur seals, with up to 400 pups born each year, though many drown in storms.  black-faced cormorants also breed on the island and little penguins roost there.

See also

List of islands of Tasmania

References

Islands of North East Tasmania
Protected areas of Tasmania
Waterhouse Island group